Tetragona clavipes, called borá or vorá in Brazil, is a species of eusocial stingless bee in the family Apidae and tribe Meliponini. In Brazil, it has been recorded in the northern state of Roraima.

References 

Meliponini
Hymenoptera of South America
Hymenoptera of Brazil
Insects described in 1804